A Taste for Butchery is a six-track EP by Norwegian metal band, Blood Red Throne. It was originally released in 2002 and later re-released as a split-CD with the Dutch death metal band Severe Torture.

Track listing 
 "Ravenous War Machine" – 6:57
 "The Children Shall Endure..." – 3:26
 "Mary Whispers of Death" – 4:49
 "Monument of Death" – 3:09
 "Cryptic Realms" (Massacre cover) – 4:50
 "Malignant Nothingness" – 3:31

2002 albums
Blood Red Throne albums